Everything is the sixth studio album by Canadian country music artist Jason McCoy. It was released by Open Road Recordings on March 1, 2011.

Everything was nominated for Country Album of the Year at the 2012 Juno Awards.

Track listing

References

External links
[ Everything] at Allmusic

2011 albums
Jason McCoy albums
Open Road Recordings albums